During the closing ceremony of the 2012 Summer Olympics in London, the flag bearers of 205 National Olympic Committees (NOCs) arrived into the main Olympic Stadium. The flags of each country were not necessarily carried by the same flag bearer as in the opening ceremony.

Countries and flagbearers

Below is a list of all parading countries with their announced flag bearer, sorted in the order in which they appeared in the parade. This is sortable by country name under which they entered, the flag bearer's name, or the flag bearer's sport. Names are given as were officially designated by the International Olympic Committee (IOC).

References

closing ceremony flag bearers
Lists of Olympic flag bearers